Church of San Salvador may refer to:

Church of San Salvador (Cifuentes)
Church of San Salvador (Guetaria)
Church of San Salvador de Valdediós
Church of San Salvador de Priesca